General George Vaughan Hart (1752 – 14 June 1832) was a British Army officer and politician.

He served with the 46th Regiment of Foot during the American War of Independence. He moved to India, where he took part in the battles of Seringapatam and Bangalore. From 1812 to 1831 he served as member of parliament for County Donegal.

He was later Governor of Londonderry and Culmore Fort.

References

United Services Magazine

External links 
 

British Army generals
46th Regiment of Foot officers
British Army personnel of the American Revolutionary War
Members of the Parliament of the United Kingdom for County Donegal constituencies (1801–1922)
55th Regiment of Foot officers
Gordon Highlanders officers
1752 births
1832 deaths
British military personnel of the Third Anglo-Mysore War
UK MPs 1812–1818
UK MPs 1818–1820
UK MPs 1820–1826
UK MPs 1826–1830
UK MPs 1830–1831